Jasperse is a surname. Notable people with the surname include:

John Jasperse (born 1963), American choreographer and dancer
Rick Jasperse (born 1956), American politician